Beyond International Limited is an international television and film production company with operations in Ireland, the United Kingdom, Australia and the United States. The company is involved in the creation and international distribution of television, feature films and ancillary products. The company has an extensive television program catalogue of over 5,000 hours and covers all genres including drama, feature films, comedy, children's, reality, and documentary programs.

The company was formed in 1984 to produce the science and technology magazine program Beyond 2000, a commercial reworking of the program Towards 2000 which aired on the Australian public broadcaster ABC. Beyond 2000 was later rebooted in 2005 as Beyond Tomorrow.

Other notable programming produced and/or distributed by Beyond include MythBusters, Deadly Women, Beat Bugs and Highway Thru Hell.

History
The company was founded by producers Carmel Travers, Iain Finlay and Chris Ardill-Guinness, as well as consultant Phil Gerlach and accountant Mikael Borglund, briefly titled CIC Productions, initially with the intention of making only one program, Beyond 2000 after which the company took its name. The company took responsibility for distributing the series, finding success in selling the program overseas, including to Discovery Channel in America and an American adaptation for FOX.

Early programs produced by Beyond include Just For the Record and Jack Thompson Down Under for Network Ten and Chances for the Nine Network. Beyond's relationship with Discovery Channel saw the company commissioned to produce a number of the channel's early programs, including a nine-season run of Invention and eventually the company's most successful program Mythbusters.

In 2009, Beyond acquired distribution company Magna Pacific from receivership.

In 2013, Beyond formed a joint venture with Seven West Media called 7Beyond to produce programs in North America. 7Beyond shows include My Lottery Dream Home and My Kitchen Rules. In July 2020, Beyond International purchased Seven West Media's shareholding.

In 2020, Beyond acquired TCB Media Rights from receivership, following the collapse of Kew Media Group, valuing TCB at around $2.5 million. TCB Media Rights invests and distributes factual series including Abandoned Engineering and Extreme Ice Machines.

In October 2022, it was announced that Banijay would acquire Beyond. The acquisition was completed on December 30, 2022 and Beyond was delisted from the Australian Securities Exchange on January 3, 2023. At the end of February 2023, most of the company's employees at the company's distribution and sales arm (Beyond Rights) were let go. Beyond Rights will eventually be folded into Banijay's own distribution and sales arm, Banijay Rights.

Ownership
The company was listed on the ASX from 1987 until 2023. In 2008, FremantleMedia purchased just under 20% of shares in the company, making it the largest shareholder.

Television series

References

External links

Television production companies of Ireland
Television production companies of the United Kingdom
Television production companies of Australia
Television production companies of the United States
Banijay
 *Beyond International Group
Irish companies established in 1984
British companies established in 1984
Australian companies established in 1984
American companies established in 1984
Entertainment companies established in 1984
2022 mergers and acquisitions